How Beautiful Life Can Be is the debut studio album by the English indie rock band the Lathums, released on 24 September 2021 by record label Island Records. The album debuted at number one on the UK Albums Chart on 1 October 2021.

Background
The band's producer, the Coral's James Skelly, helped create the album, which featured some of the band's singles from 2019 and 2021. He also helped produce new songs that would appear on their debut album.

Alex Moore mentioned in an interview on Radio X that during the lockdown, where they were able to socially distance from one another, they started playing the song "Circles of Faith", which they decided would be the opening track for their debut album. It was the first song recorded for How Beautiful Life Can Be.

Critical reception

NME gave the album four out of five stars stating, "It's been quite a year for them during the pandemic." The Guardian gave the three out of five stars stating that "Its retro sensibility and guileless tone means How Beautiful Life Can Be is the guitar music equivalent of comfort food: undemanding, slightly stupefying, but immensely cheering all the same". On Metacritic, it received an average score of 72, with four positive reviews and two mixed reviews.

Track listing

Notes
 "Numa Numa Yey" is a cover of the song "Dragostea Din Tei" by the Moldavian pop group, O-Zone. (The track is only available on the extended edition on Apple Music.)

Personnel
 Alex Moore – lead vocals, rhythm guitar
 Scott Concepcion – lead guitar, backing vocals, piano (track 12)
 Johnny Cunliffe – bass guitar
 Ryan Durrans – drums

Charts

References

2021 debut albums
Island Records albums